Rowing at the 1920 Summer Olympics, the first Olympics after World War I, saw five events. The competitions were held from 27 to 29 August in Antwerp, Belgium.

The event was marked by the arrival of future triple gold medalists John B. Kelly Sr., Jack Beresford and Paul Costello. Kelly and Beresford would stage a dramatic dual for the singles title, with Kelly prevailing. Immediately after his victory, Kelly would step into the double with his cousin Paul Costello, and easily win the gold in that event. Beresford, though he didn't win gold in these Olympics, would medal at five straight Olympics.

In the eight, the United States was represented by the United States Naval Academy. The United States would be represented by university crews at the next seven games in the men's eight, winning each time.

Medal summary

Participating nations
A total of 136 rowers from 14 nations competed at the Antwerp Games:

Medal table

References

Sources
 
 International Olympic Committee medal database

 
1920
1920 Summer Olympics events